Shandur Polo Festival is a sports festival held annually from 7th to 9th July in Shandur Polo Ground, Ghizer, Gilgit-Baltistan, Pakistan. The polo tournament is played between the teams of Gilgit-Baltistan Districts and Chitral District, under freestyle rules.

Organized and financed by Gilgit-Baltistan Government. The tournament is held at Shandur Top which is the world highest polo ground at an altitude of 3,700 meters (the pass itself is at 3,800 meters). The festival also includes folk music, dancing and a camping village is set up. The polo tournament is featured in the first episode of Himalaya with Michael Palin.

History
Polo is an equestrian sport first played in Central Asia in 6th century BC. Its objective was to train the cavalry and simulate a real-life battle.

The world’s highest polo ground is in the small village of Shindoor in Pakistan. Located at an altitude of 12,000 feet above sea level, the ground sits in the shadow of the towering Hindukash mountain range. The unique location of the polo ground makes it a popular destination for adventure seekers and polo enthusiasts.

In 1935, UK Administrator for Northern Areas Evelyn Hey Cobb asked Balti Raja of Skardu, Ali Sher Khan Anchan, and Nambardar of Chitral, Niat Qabool Hayat Kakakhel, to construct a polo ground in Shandur, which was duly completed with the help of the local population. This polo ground was later on named as "Mas Junali". The word "Mass Junali" is derived from Khowar language. The word "Mas" means moon and "Junali" means polo ground.

Cobb was impressed by Kakakhail's resourcefulness and efficiency and wished to reward him for his service, but Kakakhail refused to accept any reward for his work. Instead, for the common benefit, Kakakhail asked Cobb to bring trout to stock the local streams. Cobb ordered live trout from England and dropped them into the Ghizer River. Due to this service, the Directorate of Fisheries was established and hundreds of people were employed. Now, the mass of those fishes in Hundarap Lake reaches 24 kg and in Baha Lake Khukush Nallah, their mass reaches 40 kg. Therefore, Mas Junali became a source of connection between the people of Chitral District in Khyber Pakhtunkhwa and neighbouring Gilgit-Baltistan.

Tournament format and rules 
Free-styled mountain polo is arguably polo in its purest form. This version of the game played at Shandur Top has attained legendary status and is of great interest to international and domestic adventure tourists alike. There are no umpires and there are no holds barred. In The Roof of the World, Amin/Willets/Tetley write: "by comparison, an American Wild West rodeo might pass for choir practice." As one player once mentioned: "You can ride head-on into the opponent, if you dare."

In order to decide the final teams to play at the Shandur Polo Festival, preliminary matches are played both in Chitral and Gilgit, in which the best horses and players are chosen for the final games by the local juries. The festival begins on 7th July. During the course of the tournament A, B, C and D teams of Chitral and Gilgit battle it out on the polo field. Each team has six members with 2 to 4 reserve players in case of injury etc. The match usually lasts one hour. It is divided into two halves, with a ten-minute interval. During intervals, the locals enthrall the audiences with traditional and cultural performances. The game is decided in favour of the team scoring more goals. The final is held on 9th July.

The field measures about 200 meters by 56 meters (a regular polo field is about 270m by 150m), with 60 cm high stone walls running the length of the field on both sides instead of boards. As six players make up one side, the field can get fairly crowded. This has the advantage of slightly slowing down the pace, which, all things considered, is probably somewhat safety-enhancing. Players rarely wear helmets, the horses' legs often have no bandages, and mallets often have no grips or straps.

See also 
 Lowari Pass
 Tirich Mir

References

Further reading 

Sports festivals in Pakistan
Chitral District
Polo in Pakistan
Festival in Gilgit baltistan
Sport in Gilgit Baltistan